The Septet in E-flat major for clarinet, horn, bassoon, violin, viola, cello, and double bass, Op. 20, by Ludwig van Beethoven, was sketched out in 1799, completed, and first performed in 1800 and published in 1802. The score contains the notation: "Der Kaiserin Maria Theresia gewidmet" (Dedicated to the Empress Maria Theresa). It was one of Beethoven’s most popular works during his lifetime.

Structure and analysis

The composition is in six movements and runs approximately 40 minutes in performance:

Analysis 

The overall layout resembles a serenade and is in fact more or less the same as that of Mozart's string trio, K. 563, in the same key, but Beethoven expands the form by the addition of substantial introductions to the first and last movements and by changing the second minuet to a scherzo. The main theme of the third movement had already been used in Beethoven's Piano Sonata No. 20 (Op. 49 No. 2), which was an earlier work despite its higher opus number. The finale features a violin cadenza.

The scoring of the Septet for a single clarinet, horn and bassoon (rather than for pairs of these wind instruments) was innovative. So was the unusually prominent role of the clarinet, as important as the violin.

The Septet was one of Beethoven's most successful and popular works and circulated in many editions and arrangements for different forces. In about 1803, Beethoven himself arranged the work as a trio for clarinet (or violin), cello, and piano, and this version was published as his Op. 38 in 1805 in Vienna. Beethoven dedicated the Trio Op. 38 to Professor Johann Adam Schmidt (1759–1809), a German-Austrian surgeon and ophthalmologist, and a personal physician of Beethoven, whom he attended to from 1801 until 1809.

Conductor Arturo Toscanini rearranged the string section of the Septet so that it could be played by the full string section of the orchestra, but he did not change the rest of the scoring. He recorded the Septet for RCA Victor with the NBC Symphony Orchestra on November 26, 1951, in Carnegie Hall.

Influence
Franz Schubert composed his 1824 Octet (in F major, D. 803) for the clarinetist Ferdinand Troyer who had requested a piece similar to Beethoven's Septet, and the works accordingly resemble each other in many ways.
In 1840, Franz Liszt arranged Beethoven's Septet for piano, first for two hands (S.465) and then for four hands (S.634). Several other piano arrangements have been published, by such figures as Carl Czerny, Ernst Pauer, Adolf Ruthardt, and Hugo Ulrich.
Peter Schickele parodied the Septet with P. D. Q. Bach's Schleptet in E-flat major, S.0, but replaced the clarinet and double bass with flute and oboe.
British composer Peter Fribbins composed a septet (subtitled "The Zong Affair") for the same instrumentation as Beethoven's, but took his influence from J. M. W. Turner's painting The Slave Ship.

In popular culture 
The theme song for the Spanish dub of the French TV series Once Upon a Time... Man is sung to the tune of the Septet. The lyrics were written by the Spanish singer-songwriter José Luis Perales.

References

Further reading

External links
 
 , London Symphony Orchestra Discovery A Level Seminar 2012
 , Vienna Philharmonic Chamber Ensemble

Chamber music by Ludwig van Beethoven
1800 compositions
Compositions in E-flat major
Compositions for septet
Music dedicated to nobility or royalty